The fourth season of the American television drama series Mad Men premiered on July 25, 2010 and concluded on October 17, 2010. It consisted of thirteen episodes, each running approximately 48 minutes in length. AMC broadcast the fourth season on Sundays at 10:00 pm in the United States. 

Season four takes place between November 1964 and October 1965. It is set at the new and considerably more modern advertising agency, Sterling Cooper Draper Pryce. The main narrative of the fourth season is driven by Don Draper's identity crisis. As Don falls deeper into existential despair, he begins regularly meeting with prostitutes and faces debilitating alcoholism.

The fourth season of Mad Men was widely commended by television critics, who viewed it as continuing the show's excellence in all areas of production while featuring strong character development in addition. Its seventh episode ("The Suitcase") garnered especially strong praise. The season received the Primetime Emmy Award for Outstanding Drama Series and recognition from the American Film Institute for the show's fourth year in a row.

Cast

Main cast
 Jon Hamm as Don Draper
 Elisabeth Moss as Peggy Olson
 Vincent Kartheiser as Pete Campbell
 January Jones as Betty Francis
 Christina Hendricks as Joan Harris
 Jared Harris as Lane Pryce
 Aaron Staton as Ken Cosgrove
 Rich Sommer as Harry Crane
 Kiernan Shipka as Sally Draper
 Robert Morse as Bert Cooper
 John Slattery as Roger Sterling

Recurring cast

Guest stars
 Patrick Cavanaugh as "Smitty" Smith
 Rosemarie DeWitt as Midge Daniels
 Anne Dudek as Francine Hanson
 Laura Regan as Jennifer Crane
 Myra Turley as Katherine Olson
 Audrey Wasilewski as Anita Olson Respola
 Ray Wise as Ed Baxter

Plot
An Advertising Age reporter's question, "Who is Don Draper?" begins the season as it picks up in November 1964, and Don avoids the question. The article is to promote the new Sterling Cooper Draper Pryce advertising agency which, despite its status as the scrappy newcomer, is struggling. The article's finished product does not go over well, making Don look like a cipher. Don comes back from this public relations disaster by cavalierly throwing a client out of his office after they show concern about his supposedly risque advertising pitch. 

The main narrative of the fourth season is driven by Don Draper's identity crisis after the dissolution of his marriage to Betty. As Don falls deeper into existential despair, his alcoholism worsens and he begins regularly meeting with prostitutes. Don's life is falling apart. He snaps at his maid. He meets with a prostitute over the holidays. He is dismissive toward his blind date. He sleeps with his well-meaning secretary Allison – breaking his own rules and her heart – and she eventually quits in a flurry of anguish and resentment. His relationship with Betty is toxic, and she makes it hard for him to see his children. He is drinking more than ever before; frequently, he blacks out. 

He makes a trip out to California to see Anna Draper and meets her niece, Stephanie. After he tries to seduce her, Stephanie tearfully tells Don that Anna is dying of cancer, a fact her family has hidden from Anna thus far. Don, unable to spend time with Anna knowing she is going to die, tells her he will return to California soon with his kids, knowing that it's a lie.

Sally is having a difficult time at the Francis home. After a friend's mother catches Sally masturbating at a sleepover, Betty demands that Sally be sent to therapy despite Don's protestations. Sally's therapist offers comfort to Sally but additionally spends a significant amount of time analyzing Betty. 

Pete and Peggy seem to be going off on different cultural paths. Pete accepts fatherhood when Trudy gives birth to a baby girl. Peggy, meanwhile, makes friends with a group of beatniks, including Joyce, a lesbian photo editor at Life magazine and Abe, a liberal writer whom she starts to date. However, Peggy's relationship with Don becomes frayed after Don wins a prestigious award for a commercial whose success largely depended on Peggy. When Don causes Peggy to miss her own surprise birthday party (arranged by boyfriend Mark) in order to work on a presentation for Samsonite suitcases, the tension comes to a head. Nevertheless, the tension is defused when a drunk Duck (still longing for Peggy) shows up and punches Don after assuming the two are lovers. That night, Don and Peggy fall asleep on the couch in Don's office, and Don has a vision of a spectral Anna Draper carrying a suitcase. Anna's ghost simply smiles and walks out of the office. Don having received an urgent message from Stephanie the day prior, returns this call after waking up, who confirms that Anna Draper has indeed died. After hanging up the phone, Don turns to Peggy and breaks down in tears. Peggy comforts Don, and the two hold hands in an act of friendship.

After Anna's death, Don cuts down on his drinking and is shown to be increasingly introspective; he begins to keep a journal and exercise regularly. He asks Faye Miller, a consultant at Sterling Cooper Draper Pryce, out on a formal date. The two become involved in a relationship. Around the same time, Roger and Joan have sex after getting mugged in a poor neighborhood. Joan becomes pregnant and decides to pass the child off as Greg's rather than take Roger's money for an abortion.
 
At the agency, Roger loses the Lucky Strike account, putting the financial security of the entire company in jeopardy. Don worries about his secret after FBI agents come to the Francis home to question Betty about Don. The interrogation turns out to be a routine response to any requests for security clearance at North American Aviation, the application for which was submitted by Pete and Don's new secretary Megan Calvet. Don forces Pete to drop the aforementioned client in order to prevent any discovery of his identity theft. Furthermore, he confesses his secret to Faye, who advises Don to come clean about his past to the authorities rather than continue living in fear. Don distances himself in response to this as well as her proclamation that she cannot see herself as a mother to Don's children. He later discovers that his past mistress (from season one), Midge Daniels, is now in the throes of heroin addiction. In order to put a positive spin on being dropped from Lucky Strike (and perhaps partly motivated by Midge's desperation and inner destruction), Don writes an Op Ed in The New York Times proclaiming to the nation that Sterling Cooper Draper Pryce is taking a healthful stand and, from here on out, will no longer be doing business with Big Tobacco. The sensational move does not go over well with the other SCDP employees, except Megan, who admires it.

In October 1965, Don takes his kids on a trip to California (with Megan in tow) and stops by Anna Draper's home, now occupied by Stephanie. Sally notices a message painted on the wall ("Dick + Anna 64") and asks Don who Dick is. Don responds: "That's me", and brushes the question off by claiming it's his nickname. Over the course of the weekend, Don decides that he is in love with Megan and proposes to her the morning after their return. 

Peggy and Ken, meanwhile, save the company by signing new work with Topaz Pantyhose. Betty and Henry move out of the Drapers' Ossining home after Betty fires their nanny/housekeeper over her refusal to help Betty break up the budding friendship between Sally and Glen, a neighborhood boy who warns Sally of the dangers of parents who remarry. Don announces the news of his engagement to Megan to the office and, later, over the phone to Faye, who is left in tears. Don returns to the Draper home one last time to say goodbye to Betty, who shows signs of regret towards the ending of their marriage as they leave their former home for the last time. They depart through separate exits. The season closes with Don lying awake with Megan, looking out toward the window.

Episodes

Production

Crew
Series creator Matthew Weiner also served as showrunner and executive producer, and is credited as a writer on 10 of the 13 episodes of the season, often co-writing the episodes with another writer. Lisa Albert became consulting producer and co-wrote one episode. Writing team Andre Jacquemetton and Maria Jacquemetton were promoted to co-executive producers and co-wrote one episode together. Erin Levy was promoted to staff writer and wrote two episodes. Dahvi Waller was promoted to producer and wrote one episode. Brett Johnson was promoted to staff writer and wrote one episode. New writers in the fourth season included consulting producer Janet Leahy, who co-wrote one episode; producer Jonathan Abrahams, who wrote two episodes; co-producer Keith Huff, who co-wrote one episode; and freelance writers Tracy McMillan and Jonathan Igla, who each co-wrote one episode. Other producers included Blake McCormick, Dwayne Shattuck, and executive producer Scott Hornbacher.

Phil Abraham directed the most episodes of the season with three, while Jennifer Getzinger, Michael Uppendahl, and series star John Slattery each directed two. The remaining episodes were directed by Lesli Linka Glatter, Scott Hornbacher, Lynn Shelton, and Matthew Weiner, who directs each season finale.

Reception

Critical reception
The fourth season of Mad Men received widespread critical acclaim. Review aggregator Rotten Tomatoes reports that 97% of 35 critics have given the season a positive review. The site's consensus is: "While Mad Men continues to darken in tone, it remains one of the most provocative, intelligent shows on television." On Metacritic, the fourth season scored 92 out of 100 based on 30 reviews, indicating universal acclaim; it has the highest score of all Mad Men seasons. 

Robert Bianco of USA Today said that the series was "adept at changing course without diminishing its appeal or fundamentally altering its core". Maureen Ryan said that "the season was really, in the end, all about who Don Draper was and what he felt comfortable sharing, if not in interviews, in life. And it was hard not to root for Don once he'd found happiness", yet noted that season 4 was strong because of the focus on Sterling Cooper Draper Pryce. She also said that "The season began with a reporter asking, "Who is Don Draper?" He is, if nothing else, loved. And that's a far cry from the man we met in season 1, who wasn't truly known by anyone, except perhaps Anna." 

Alan Sepinwall of HitFix felt that the fourth season was one of the strongest years, saying "this was a very different season for the show, but no less compelling. If anything, that off-kilter quality led to some of the show's best episodes ever, like "The Suitcase". Mad Men seasons often seem to need a handful of episodes to ramp up, but here all we really needed was the expository premiere, and we were off to the races after that. Great show. Great season." The A.V. Club writer Keith Phipps considered it the best season of the series so far, noting that "Matthew Weiner knows every rule of creating tense, dramatic story arcs and then willfully ignores them. Happily, his subversive tendencies have their own sort of satisfaction." Keith also observed that the best episodes of the season were light on plot, praising the "ruminative depth" of "mood pieces" like "The Good News" and "The Suitcase".

James Poniewozik of Time magazine said that Season 4 was the second-best season, slotting in just behind the first season, saying that "I think that a season that started strong—and had, through its middle, perhaps its best run of episodes ever—seemed to lose a bit of focus and momentum in its last third." Heather Havrilesky of Salon said that during the fourth season, "The central identity parable of Mad Men, which seemed like a simple act of deception in the first few seasons, has deepened into something richer and more ominous. Don Draper reflects the American compulsion to sidestep the hard work of living a flawed but authentic life for the empty illusion of perfection, as shiny and skin-deep as an advertisement that promises the impossible."

Eric Deggans of the Tampa Bay Times said that "I have been told by much more accomplished storytellers than myself that this season was among the series' best. But I have been deeply ambivalent about the episodes". Deggans also criticized the lack of focus on race, as well as the show's attempts at unpredictability, comparing it to The Sopranos. He did, however, praise the character development of Peggy Olson.

Accolades
The fourth season was celebrated with 19 nominations at the 63rd Primetime Emmy Awards (the most nominations the series has ever received from the Emmys), as well as many other industry honors. The series won the award for Outstanding Drama Series for the fourth year in a row, tying with L.A. Law, Hill Street Blues, and The West Wing for most wins in the category.

Jon Hamm was once again nominated for Outstanding Lead Actor in a Drama Series, while Elisabeth Moss was nominated for Outstanding Lead Actress in a Drama Series. John Slattery was honored with a nomination for Outstanding Supporting Actor in a Drama Series. Christina Hendricks' performance was recognized with a nomination for Outstanding Supporting Actress in a Drama Series. Robert Morse received yet another nomination for Outstanding Guest Actor in a Drama Series for his work as Bert Cooper. In addition, Cara Buono (Faye Miller) and Randee Heller (Ida Blankenship) were nominated for Outstanding Guest Actress in a Drama Series. Andre Jacquemetton and Maria Jacquemetton were nominated for Outstanding Writing for a Drama Series for "Blowing Smoke". Matthew Weiner also received a nomination in the same category for writing "The Suitcase".

The American Film Institute honored the series as one of the ten greatest television achievements of 2010, for the fourth year in a row. AFI referred to the fourth season as its finest, and praised Jon Hamm, the ensemble cast, and the storyline revolving around Don Draper's decline. AFI also exalted creator Matthew Weiner as a "master of the medium". The fourth season of Mad Men was nominated for the Best Television Drama Series at the 68th Golden Globe Awards. Jon Hamm was nominated for the Best Actor – Television Series Drama award for the fourth year in a row. Elisabeth Moss also received a nomination for the Best Actress – Television Series Drama award.

Mad Men won "Dramatic Series" at the 2010 WGA Awards. The episode "The Chrysanthemum and the Sword" also won the "Episodic Drama" award. Jennifer Getzinger was nominated for a Directors Guild Award for directing "The Suitcase". The fourth season also won the Outstanding Achievement in Drama award at the 27th Television Critics Association Awards. Jon Hamm also won the Individual Achievement in Drama award for his performance as Don Draper during the fourth season.

References

External links
 
 

2010 American television seasons
 
Television series set in 1964
Television series set in 1965